Commodore Sir Thomas Erasmus Barlow, 3rd Baronet  (23 January 1914 – 12 October 2003) was an officer in the Royal Navy.

Biography
Barlow was the eldest son of the Sir Alan Barlow, 2nd Bt, and his wife Nora Darwin. His younger brother was the visual neuroscientist Horace Barlow.  His maternal grandfather was Horace Darwin, and amongst his great-grandfathers were the naturalist Charles Darwin, the statistician and civil servant Thomas Farrer, 1st Baron Farrer, and the royal physician Sir Thomas Barlow.

After being educated at Winchester College, Barlow entered the Royal Navy in 1932 as a Cadet.  He qualified on submarines in 1937 and during the Second World War served aboard submarines in the Atlantic, Mediterranean, Indian Ocean and Far East.  His commands were:

  (13 Aug 1941 – 10 Jan 1942)
  (11 Jan 1942 – 7 Dec 1942)
  (20 Aug 1943 – 30 Nov 1943)
  (15 Mar 1944 – Oct 1945)

In 1945 he was awarded the Distinguished Service Cross. He was promoted to commander in 1950 and captain in 1954, and was commodore of HMNB Devonport between 1962 and his retirement in 1964.

He married Isabel Body (1915–2005), daughter of the medical doctor Thomas Munn Body, on 9 July 1955 and they had four children:

 Sir James Alan Barlow, 4th Baronet (born 10 July 1956)
 Dr. Monica Anne Barlow (born 7 March 1958)
 Philip Thomas Barlow (born 31 December 1960)
 Teresa Mary Barlow (born 6 October 1963)

Barlow succeeded to the title of 3rd Baronet Barlow, of Wimpole Street, London on 28 February 1968, after the death of his father.  He was appointed a Deputy Lieutenant of Buckinghamshire in 1976.

Barlow was also a conservationist and was a trustee of the Galapagos Conservation Trust.

Barlow was also a trustee for over 20 years of the Barlow Collection of Oriental art collected by his father.  In 1997 Sir Thomas, along with his brother Erasmus Barlow were both awarded honorary Doctors of Letters degrees by the University of Sussex, who were bequeathed the Barlow Collection in 1968 on the death of Sir Alan

Ancestry

References

External links 
 http://www.sussex.ac.uk/press_office/bulletin/28nov03/article20.shtml
 http://groups.google.com/group/alt.obituaries/browse_frm/thread/264b3eeecfa2b359/718ea727ce367891?lnk=st
 BARLOW, Sir Thomas (Erasmus)’, Who Was Who, A & C Black, 1920–2008; online edn, Oxford University Press, Dec 2007 Retrieved 26 May 2011

1914 births
2003 deaths
Darwin–Wedgwood family
People educated at Winchester College
Royal Navy officers
Recipients of the Distinguished Service Cross (United Kingdom)
Baronets in the Baronetage of the United Kingdom
Royal Navy officers of World War II
Deputy Lieutenants of Buckinghamshire
Royal Navy submariners